Andrew de Buchan (d. 1304?) was a Scottish Cistercian, bishop of Caithness from 1296.

He was Abbot of Coupar Angus by 1284. He paid homage to Edward I of England at Perth 24 July 1291, and at Berwick-on-Tweed 28 August 1296. He was nominated to the bishopric of Caithness by Pope Boniface VIII, 17 December 1296.

Andrew de Buchan died in or before 1304.

Notes

Attribution

Year of birth missing
1304 deaths
Scottish Cistercians
13th-century Scottish Roman Catholic bishops
14th-century Scottish Roman Catholic bishops
Bishops of Caithness